Seri Alam is a township in Mukim Plentong, Johor Bahru District, Johor, Malaysia. It is an initiative by Seri Alam Properties Sdn Bhd, a subsidiary of United Malayan Land Bhd. The township covers approximately 15 square kilometers and houses an ecology educational facilities from school age to campuses of some of the world's leading universities. City of Knowledge aims to be the center of educational excellence in the eastern part of Iskandar Malaysia.

The township which spans over 3,762 acres (15 km2) falls under the city of Majlis Bandaraya Pasir Gudang (MBPG).

Educations
Today, Seri Alam has been actually acknowledged as City of Knowledge with several universities, including the University Kuala Lumpur (UniKL - operational 2011), University Technology Mara (UiTM - completed 2013),Asia Metropolitan University  (operational 2011), Mara Science Junior College (MRSM - operational 2011), Malaysia Art School (completed 2013), Excelsior International School (completed 2013), Pegasus International School (operational 2013), Japanese School, Nam Heng Chinese Primary School as well as seven other national primary and secondary schools.

Primary school
SK Seri Alam
Sekolah Agama Seri Alam
SJK (C) Nam Heng <南兴华小>
Sekolah Rendah Jenis Kebangsaan Tamil Masai

Secondary school
Sekolah Menengah Kebangsaan Dato' Penggawa Timur (SMKDPT)
Sekolah Menengah Kebangsaan Seri Alam (SMK BSA)
Sekolah Menengah Kebangsaan Seri Alam 2 (SMKSA2)
Foon Yew High School Masai Campus

Others
Medical Campus of Asia Metropolitan University
University Kuala Lumpur (UniKL)
University Technology Mara (UiTM)
Mara Junior Science College (MRSM)
Pegasus International School
Malaysia Arts School 
Japanese School
Repton International School

Facilities & Amenities
Regency Specialist Hospital
Tesco Hypermarket Seri Alam
Today's Market
Post Office
Seri Alam District Police Headquarters (IPD)
Amansari Residence Resort
24-Hour McDonald's Drive Thru Restaurant
Starbucks Seri Alam
Public Bank
Burger King Drive Thru Restaurant
Grand Straits Garden Seafood Restaurant
Watsons Personal Care Store (without pharmacy)
Safe & Well Healthcare Store
Focus Point Eye Care Store
Bata Shoes Store
KFC
OldTown White Coffee
Moonlight Cafe
Tea Garden Café <古文茶>
Subway
Marrybrown
Big Valley Ranch Resort cum Tourist Destination
Natural Lakes and Parks
Taman Tasek Seri Alam
Octville Golf and Country Club
District shuttle bus station
Taxi stand
Family Mart
The J Seri Alam
Kuching Style Restaurant

Transportation
The area is accessible by Muafakat Bus route P-301.

Future plan
On 23.10.2018, Developer United Malayan Land Bhd (UMLand) will build a RM100 million shopping mall in Seri Alam with the construction expected to start in the first quarter of 2019. The Seri Alam Mall is the first shopping within the vicinity of Pasir Gudang and will serve the 220,000 population within the area. The completion is scheduled in early 2021.

References

[1] 

[2] 

[3] http://www.slideshare.net/myrnamiraj/bandar-seri-alam-city-of-knowledge

[4] http://www.slideshare.net/BraelynnTee/presentation-for-bandar-seri-alam

Pasir Gudang
Townships in Johor